Zania is a village in the Tapini Rural LLG of the Goilala District of Papua New Guinea.

Populated places in Central Province (Papua New Guinea)